Beau Falloon (born 21 May 1987) is a former professional rugby league footballer who last played for Leeds in the Super League.

Background
Falloon was born in Sydney, New South Wales, Australia.

Playing career
Falloon played with the South Sydney Rabbitohs for 3 seasons making 25 appearances. Falloon spent most of his playing time during this period with Souths feeder side the North Sydney Bears. At Norths, Falloon made a total of 53 appearances and scored 15 tries.

He joined the Gold Coast Titans in 2012. On 15 February 2015, Fallon was suspended as revelations unfold pertaining to the Karmichael Hunt/Smith/Seers cocaine trafficking investigation – Court date 5 March 2015.  Although the charges against Falloon were thrown out of court, The Gold Coast side announced that they would not be re-signing Falloon for the following season.

On 23 October 2015, Falloon signed a one-year contract with Super League champions, Leeds Rhinos, starting in 2016.

References

External links

NRL profile
Gold Coast Titans profile

1987 births
Living people
Australian rugby league players
Burleigh Bears players
Gold Coast Titans players
Leeds Rhinos players
New South Wales City Origin rugby league team players
North Sydney Bears NSW Cup players
Rugby league hookers
South Sydney Rabbitohs players